Out of the Woods may refer to:

"Out of the Woods" (song), a  2014 song by Taylor Swift
Out of the Woods (Oregon album), 1978
Out of the Woods (Tracey Thorn album), 2007